Yury Ionovich Morozov (born 5 August 1949 in Sterlitamak, Bashkir ASSR, Russian SFSR, USSR) is a Russian businessman and politician, and a former Prime Minister of South Ossetia. Morozov was confirmed by the Parliament of South Ossetia on 5 July 2005. 23 Out of 24 MPs present voted in favour of his candidacy. On 18 August 2008, it was announced that Morozov and his government had been dismissed by South Ossetian President Eduard Kokoity. Kokoity said he thought the government was not handling the emergency aid from Russia, which was arriving after the 2008 South Ossetia war, good enough.

According to accounts of several South Ossetian military and political leaders, Morozov fled Tskhinval at onset of Georgian attack. Anatoly Bibilov, then deputy commander of North Ossetian peacekeeping battalion, claimed that already at 5 am of 8 August 2008 (6 hours after the  bombardment of Tskhinval had started), Morozov was in Vladikavkaz.  Boris Chochiev, then Deputy Prime Minister of South Ossetia, has also claimed that when he connected with Morozov on the phone on 8 August and asked to help organize evacuation of women and children, Morozov was in Vladikavkaz and effectively declined any responsibility, exclaiming "F## you and your children!"

Cabinet

Source:

References

1949 births
Living people
People from Sterlitamak
Prime Ministers of South Ossetia